The FIL European Luge Championships 1962 took place in Weißenbach, Austria. It marked the first time event was held under the auspices of the International Luge Federation (FIL) which was formed in 1957. Also, it was the first time the championships had been held after being cancelled from 1957 to 1961.

Men's singles

Women's singles

Men's doubles

Medal table

References
FIL-Luge.org list of European luge champions  - Accessed January 31, 2008.
Men's doubles European champions
Men's singles European champions
Women's singles European champions

FIL European Luge Championships
1962 in luge
Luge in Austria
1962 in Austrian sport